"Fiesta (Remix)" is a song by singer R. Kelly featuring rappers Jay-Z & Boo & Gotti. The hit song spent five weeks at number-one on the US R&B chart and peaked at number six on the US pop chart. R. Kelly and Jay-Z have worked several times together. In 2002, they released the album "The Best of Both Worlds" which sold 285,000 copies in its first week. The single is ranked by Billboard as the best selling and most played R&B/Hip Hop song of 2001.

Background
"Fiesta (Remix)" follows the previous single and music video, "The Storm Is Over Now". In 2001, the song spent five weeks at #1 on the US R&B chart and also reached #6 on the US Pop chart. The original "Fiesta" track is one of the 19 tracks on TP-2.com.

Music video
The music video for the single was created by R. Kelly and Little X.

Credits and personnel
R. Kelly – songwriting, vocals,  primary artist
Jay-Z – songwriting, vocals, guest appearance
Poke & Tone – songwriting, production
Larry Gates (Precision) – songwriting, production
Boo & Gotti – vocals, guest appearance
Donnie Lyle – additional guitars
Abel Garibaldi – recording, additional programming
Ian Mereness – recording
Andy Gallas – programming assistant
Rich Travali – mixing
Patrick Woodward – mixing assistant
contains a guitar sample from "Fantasia" written and performed by Pavlo Simtikidis

Legacy

Later samples
"Ignition (Remix)" by R. Kelly from the album Chocolate Factory (2003)
"Ride Til I Die" by Shawn Do, Mistah F.A.B. and Dubb 20 from the album Thizz Nation Vol. 2 (2005)
"Mafia (Remix)" by The Relativez featuring Nuttz from the album Legendary (2007)
"We F'd Up" by J Dilla from the album Pay Jay (2008)
"After Party" by The Lonely Island featuring Santigold from the album Turtleneck & Chain (2011)
"Songs on 12 Play" by Chris Brown featuring Trey Songz from the album X (2014)

Charts

Weekly charts

Year-end charts

Release history

References

2001 singles
Jay-Z songs
R. Kelly songs
Music videos directed by Director X
Songs written by R. Kelly
Song recordings produced by R. Kelly
2000 songs
Jive Records singles
Dirty rap songs